The Rapid River is a short river in central Saskatchewan, Canada, about  east of the community of Stanley Mission. It is part of the Churchill River drainage basin. The entire river is within Lac La Ronge Provincial Park.

Fish species
The fish species in the river include: walleye, sauger, yellow perch, northern pike, lake trout, lake whitefish, cisco, white sucker, shorthead redhorse, longnose sucker, lake sturgeon and burbot.

See also
List of rivers of Saskatchewan
Hudson Bay drainage basin

References

 Fish Species of Saskatchewan
Lac La Ronge Provincial Park

Rivers of Saskatchewan
Tributaries of Hudson Bay